Fountain Fresh International is a defunct United States company that operated soft drink and water dispensers at retail locations. Based in Salt Lake City, Utah, Fountain Fresh developed and marketed in-store, self-serve soft drink and pure drinking water beverage centers in the mid-1990s.

The original value proposition was for consumers to enjoy low-priced beverages by washing and refilling reusable soft-drink bottles in the Fountain Fresh dispenser. The concept was rolled out in several retail locations throughout the United States, including a large number of Wal-Mart stores. 

The stations proved messy, confusing, and difficult to operate, and few consumers saw the value of saving a few cents on beverages by using the units. The company enjoyed a brief flurry of interest in the mid-1990s, but by the late 1990s, was essentially out of business.

The company has since become an object lesson in understanding user needs before launching a major product line, and has been covered by such media outlets as NPR.

References

External links
Water Tech Online Article featuring Fountain Fresh International and the Beverage Center 2000
Behavioral Prototype: Concept and Testing Beverage Center 2000
 Discussed on This American Life in episode from April 2003.

Defunct companies based in Utah
Marketing companies of the United States